Claudia Maurer Zenck (born in 1948) is a German musicologist.

Early life, family and education 
She was born in Bremen.

She earned her promotion in 1974 at the Technical University of Berlin and her habilitation in 2000 in Innsbruck.

Career
Zenk taught from 2001 to 2013 as professor of Historical musicology at the University of Hamburg.

Publications 
 Versuch über die wahre Art, Debussy zu analysieren. Munich 1974, .
 Ernst Krenek – ein Komponist im Exil. Vienna 1980, .
 Vom Takt. Untersuchungen zur Theorie und kompositorischen Praxis im ausgehenden 18. und beginnenden 19. Jahrhundert. Vienna 2001, .
 Così fan tutte. Dramma giocoso und deutsches Singspiel. Frühe Abschriften und frühe Aufführungen. Schliengen 2007, .

Notes

References

External links 
 Profile at uni-hamburg.de

Women musicologists
20th-century German musicologists
21st-century German musicologists
Academic staff of the University of Hamburg
1948 births
Living people
Writers from Bremen
Technical University of Berlin alumni